False Evidence is a 1922 British silent drama film directed by Harold M. Shaw and starring Edna Flugrath, Cecil Humphreys and Teddy Arundell. It was adapted from an 1896  novel by Phillips Oppenheim.

Cast
 Edna Flugrath - Maude Deveraux 
 Cecil Humphreys - Rupert Deveraux 
 Teddy Arundell - Hilton 
 E. Holman Clark - Sir Frances Arbuthnot 
 Frank Petley - Herbert Arbuthnot 
 Eric Lugg - Hugh Arbuthnot 
 Constance Rayner - Marian Arbuthnot

References

External links

1922 films
1922 drama films
Films directed by Harold M. Shaw
Films based on British novels
British drama films
British silent feature films
British black-and-white films
1920s English-language films
1920s British films
Silent drama films